The 2000 Black Reel Awards, which annually recognize and celebrate the achievements of black people in feature, independent and television films, took place in Washington, D.C. on February 16, 2000. The Best Man and A Lesson Before Dying were the big winners of the night, taking home four awards each.

Winners and nominees
Winners are listed first and highlighted in bold.

Films with multiple nominations
The following films received multiple nominations:

Films with multiple wins
The following films received multiple wins:

Series with multiple nominations
The following television series received multiple nominations:

Series with multiple wins
The following series received multiple wins:

References

2000 in American cinema
2000 awards in the United States
Black Reel Awards
1999 film awards